Liberty Center is an unincorporated community in Liberty Township, Wells County, in the U.S. state of Indiana. Liberty Center has two Christian churches, a volunteer fire department, a gas station, and a recreational park.

History
Liberty Center was so named from its location near the geographical center of Liberty Township.

The post office at Liberty Center has been in operation since 1857.

Geography

References

Unincorporated communities in Wells County, Indiana
Unincorporated communities in Indiana
Fort Wayne, IN Metropolitan Statistical Area
1857 establishments in Indiana